The 2014–15 Oregon Ducks women's basketball team represented the University of Oregon during the 2014–15 NCAA Division I women's basketball season. The Ducks, led by first year head coach Kelly Graves, played their games at the Matthew Knight Arena and were members of the Pac-12 Conference. They finished the season 13–17, 6–12 in Pac-12 play to finish in a tie for ninth place. They lost in the first round in the Pac-12 women's tournament to Washington State.

Roster

Schedule

|-
!colspan=9 style="background:#004F27; color:yellow;"| Exhibition

|-
!colspan=9 style="background:#004F27; color:yellow;"| Non-conference regular season

|-
!colspan=9 style="background:#004F27; color:yellow;"| Pac-12 regular season

|-
!colspan=9 style="background:#004F27;"| Pac-12 Women's Tournament

Rankings

See also
2014–15 Oregon Ducks men's basketball team

References

Oregon Ducks women's basketball seasons
Oregon Ducks
Oregon Ducks
2014–15 Pac-12 Conference women's basketball season